Dawid Johannes Malan (born 3 September 1987) is an English cricketer who plays internationally for England in all formats. In domestic cricket, he represents Yorkshire, having previously played for Middlesex, and has played in multiple Twenty20 leagues, including for Punjab Kings in the Indian Premier League.

Malan made his Test and Twenty20 International (T20I) debuts in 2017, and his One Day International (ODI) debuts in 2019. In 2020, his rating in the ICC Men's Player Rankings hit 915, which remains the record high in the format. He was part of the England team that won the 2022 T20 World Cup.

Malan plays as a left-handed top-order batsman and occasional legbreak bowler.  He is one of only four Englishmen to score a T20I century.

Early life and education
Malan was born in Roehampton, London. At the age of seven he and his family moved to South Africa, where he subsequently attended Paarl Boys' High School. Shortly after making his first class debut for Boland, he joined Middlesex, where he stayed for over a decade. He is also a supporter of Liverpool F.C.

His sister, Liné, was an international field hockey player for South Africa.

Domestic career
Malan is a left-handed batsman and occasional leg-spin bowler who originally represented Boland in South Africa (2005/2006 season) and the MCC Young Cricketers in 2006. He joined Middlesex on 7 July 2006 and made his first XI debut in a Twenty20 Cup tie versus Surrey at The Oval on the same day. His father (also called Dawid) represented Western Province B, Northern Transvaal B and Teddington, as a right-handed batsman and a right-arm fast-medium bowler, and his brother Charl played for Loughborough MCCU.

In 2007 Malan was the top run scorer in the Second XI Championship with 969 runs at 51.00. He made his first-class debut for Middlesex in June 2008, scoring 132 not out. On 8 July 2008, Malan hit the 24th century in the history of the Twenty20 Cup, compiling 103 off 54 balls in the quarter-final against the Lancashire Lightning. This made him the first player to score a century batting at number six in a T20 match and he held the record for the highest score at the position until July 2018.

Malan played List-A domestic cricket for Prime Doleshwar Sporting Club in the Dhaka Premier League of Bangladesh for two seasons from 2013 to 2015, contributing with both bat and ball.

Malan was appointed as Middlesex captain across all three formats before the start of the 2018 season. He stepped down following the 2019 season and in November 2019, he signed a four-year contract to play for Yorkshire from the 2020 season. In August 2020, in the third round of matches in the 2020 Bob Willis Trophy, Malan scored his maiden double century in first-class cricket, with 219 runs.

International career
Malan was named in England's Twenty20 International (T20I) squad for their home series against South Africa in June 2017. He made 78 on his debut, on 25 June 2017, with England winning the match and Malan adjudged 'man of the match' for his batting performance. He was added to England's Test squad, ahead of the third Test against South Africa, and made his Test debut on 27 July 2017 as a number 5 batsman. In the first innings, he made 1 before being bowled out by a yorker from Kagiso Rabada; in the second innings he was dismissed for 10. He also failed to impress in his second Test, raising questions over his Test future. However, Malan kept his place for the series against the West Indies and scored his maiden Test 50, helping England to win their first day-night Test.

Malan was selected for the winter tours to Australia and New Zealand, during the 3rd Ashes Test at the WACA in December 2017, Malan scored his first Test century: his 100 was the first century of the series from the England team. Malan continued his good form in T20Is on the tour, adding another three half-centuries in the four games he played in the Trans-Tasman Tri-Series, though this was not enough to see him keep his place in the team once rested players were recalled during the following English summer. He did retain his place for the two Tests against Pakistan and the first Test against India that summer, but was dropped after a poor run of form.

Malan was added to England's One Day International (ODI) squad for their one-off match against Ireland on 3 May 2019. He made 24 runs on his ODI debut for England in the match, as a number of their World Cup squad were rested.

Malan was recalled to the T20I squad for tour to New Zealand, and, on 8 November 2019 in the fourth T20I, Malan scored his first century. It was the second, and fastest, by an England batsman, coming from just 48 balls. He played in all six of England's T20Is against Pakistan and Australia in the summer of 2020, scoring 213 runs, with his performances moving him to first position in the ICC T20I batsman rankings in September 2020. His good form in the format continued on the winter tour to South Africa, where two 'Player of the Match' performances of 55 and 99 not out in the second and third T20Is saw him reach the highest ever rating (915 points) in the ICC rankings.

In March 2021, during England's tour of India, Malan became the fastest batsman to score 1,000 runs in T20Is in 24 innings.

In August 2021, Malan was recalled for the third Test of the 2021 test series against India. Malan scored 70 in the first innings. The following month, Malan was named in England's squad for the 2021 ICC Men's T20 World Cup.

In June 2022, in the opening match against the Netherlands, Malan scored his first century in ODI cricket. He made 125 runs,as part of England's score of 498 runs, the highest team total in ODI history.  Malan was one of three centurions in the innings, along with Phil Salt and Jos Buttler.

Later in the year, Malan was part of the winning England squad at the 2022 ICC Men's T20 World Cup. He scored a total of 56 runs in the group stage, but was injured in the final group game and missed the semi-final and final.

T20 franchise cricket
Malan played for Peshawar Zalmi in the first season of the Pakistan Super League (PSL) and continued with them the following season, in which they won the Final played in Lahore. He also played for Barisal Bulls in the fourth season of the Bangladesh Premier League (BPL)

In October 2018, Malan was named in Cape Town Blitz's squad for the first edition of the Mzansi Super League T20 tournament. Later the same month, he was named in the squad for the Khulna Titans team, following the draft for the 2018–19 Bangladesh Premier League. In November 2019, he was selected to play for the Comilla Victorians in the 2019–20 Bangladesh Premier League. In October 2020, he was drafted by the Jaffna Stallions for the inaugural edition of the Lanka Premier League.

In December 2020, Malan made his debut for the Australian Big Bash League, joining the Hobart Hurricanes.

In February 2021, Malan was bought by the Punjab Kings in the IPL auction ahead of the 2021 Indian Premier League.

Malan was drafted by Trent Rockets for the inaugural season of The Hundred. In April 2022, he was bought by the Trent Rockets for the 2022 season of The Hundred.

Personal Life
Malan married Claire Mottram on 17 October 2019. The couple had their first child a baby girl on 15 January 2022.

References

External links
 
 

1987 births
Living people
Alumni of Paarl Boys' High School
Cricketers from Greater London
English people of South African descent
English cricketers
England Test cricketers
England One Day International cricketers
England Twenty20 International cricketers
Fortune Barishal cricketers
Boland cricketers
Cape Town Blitz cricketers
Comilla Victorians cricketers
Hobart Hurricanes cricketers
Islamabad United cricketers
Khulna Tigers cricketers
Marylebone Cricket Club cricketers
Middlesex cricketers
Middlesex cricket captains
North v South cricketers
Peshawar Zalmi cricketers
Prime Doleshwar Sporting Club cricketers
Punjab Kings cricketers
Trent Rockets cricketers
Yorkshire cricketers